Poecilasthena thalassias is a moth of the family Geometridae. It is known from Australia.

References

Moths described in 1891
Poecilasthena
Moths of Australia